Harriman is a surname. Notable people with the surname include:

W. Averell Harriman, Governor of New York, son of Edward
Edward Henry Harriman (1848–1909), American railroad financier
E. Roland Harriman, American railroad executive, son of Edward
Florence Jaffray Harriman, American socialite, suffragist, social reformer, organizer, and diplomat
Gladys Fries Harriman (1896–1983), American philanthropist, equestrian and big game hunter
Henry Harriman (Mormon), President of the Seventy of the Church of Jesus Christ of Latter-day Saints
Herbert M. Harriman (1873-1933), American heir, businessman and sportsman
John Harriman (botanist), English botanist
J. Borden Harriman (1864-1914), American financier
Oliver Harriman (1829-1904), American businessman
Oliver Harriman, Jr. (1862-1940), American stockbroker
Pamela Harriman, American socialite and diplomat

Fictional characters:
Delos D. Harriman, businessman and space entrepreneur in Robert A. Heinlein's stories Requiem and The Man Who Sold the Moon
John Harriman (Star Trek), fictional captain of the starship Enterprise (NCC-1701-B) in the movie Star Trek Generations